Inger Björkbom (born 6 November 1961) is a Swedish biathlete. She competed in three events at the 1992 Winter Olympics.

References

1961 births
Living people
Biathletes at the 1992 Winter Olympics
Swedish female biathletes
Olympic biathletes of Sweden
Place of birth missing (living people)